The term immediately dangerous to life or health (IDLH) is defined by the US National Institute for Occupational Safety and Health (NIOSH) as exposure to airborne contaminants that is "likely to cause death or immediate or delayed permanent adverse health effects or prevent escape from such an environment."  Examples include smoke or other poisonous gases at sufficiently high concentrations. It is calculated using the LD50 or LC50. The Occupational Safety and Health Administration (OSHA) regulation (1910.134(b)) defines the term as "an atmosphere that poses an immediate threat to life, would cause irreversible adverse health effects, or would impair an individual's ability to escape from a dangerous atmosphere."

IDLH values are often used to guide the selection of breathing apparatus that are made available to workers or firefighters in specific situations.

The NIOSH definition does not include oxygen deficiency (below 19.5 percent) although atmosphere-supplying breathing apparatus is also required. Examples include high altitudes and unventilated, confined spaces.

The OSHA definition is arguably broad enough to include oxygen-deficient circumstances in the absence of "airborne contaminants", as well as many other chemical, thermal, or pneumatic hazards to life or health (e.g., pure helium, super-cooled or super-heated air, hyperbaric or hypo-baric or submerged chambers, etc.). It also uses the broader term "impair", rather than "prevent", with respect to the ability to escape. For example, blinding but non-toxic smoke could be considered IDLH under the OSHA definition if it would impair the ability to escape a "dangerous" but not life-threatening atmosphere (such as tear gas).

The OSHA definition is part of a legal standard, which is the minimum legal requirement. Users or employers are encouraged to apply proper judgment to avoid taking unnecessary risks, even if the only immediate hazard is "reversible", such as temporary pain, disorientation, nausea, or non-toxic contamination.

NIOSH respirator selection logic 

If the concentration of harmful substances is IDLH, the worker must use the most reliable respirators. Such respirators should not use cartridges or canister with the sorbent, as their lifetime is too poorly predicted. In addition, the respirator must maintain positive pressure under the mask during inspiration, as this will prevent the leakage of unfiltered air through the gaps (which occur between the edges of the mask and the face sometimes).

Textbook NIOSH recommended for use in IDLH conditions only pressure-demand self-contained breathing apparatus with a full facepiece, or pressure-demand supplied-air respirator equipped with a full facepiece in combination with an auxiliary pressure-demand self-contained breathing apparatus.

IDLH values 
The following examples are listed in reference to IDLH values.

Legend:
 Ca NIOSH considers this substance to be a potential occupational carcinogen. Revised values may follow in parentheses.
 N.D. Not determined. That is, the level is unknown, not non-existent.
 10%LEL The IDLM value has been set at 10% of the lower explosive limit although other irreversible health effects or impairment of escape due to toxicology exist only at higher levels.

See also 
 NIOSH air filtration rating

References

External links
 NIOSH IDLH site
 1910.134(b) Respiratory protection definitions

Chemical safety
Firefighting in the United States
Occupational Safety and Health Administration
National Institute for Occupational Safety and Health